America's Most Luved Bad Guy is a compilation of Master P tracks released exclusively for digital purchase through online, digital retailers such as iTunes and Amazon in April, 2006. The 12-track set includes 6 brand new tracks, the first 6 on the record, 5 of which feature the Colonel Master P.  Tracks 7-12 were pulled from previous Master P releases "The Ghetto Bill Vol. 1: The Best Hustler in the Game" and "Living Legend: Certified D-Boy," both of which hit stores a year earlier in 2005.

Track listing

References 

2006 compilation albums
Master P albums